is a light novel series published in Hobby Japan's monthly magazine, Novel Japan. It is the third universe established by the My-HiME Project. Like the My-Otome universe that went before it, it uses many elements from the My-HiME anime and manga series, such as the same character names and designs (My-Otome changed parts of the names to reflect a more European setting) but with different lead characters and a different premise (HiME are absent and are instead replaced by MiKO and psychic characters). Currently thirteen chapters have been released.

Story 

The series follows Mayo Kagura and Shion Tennōji and centers around MiKOs, girls with psychokinetic abilities. Many other characters from the My-HiME and My-Otome series make appearances.

Characters

Main characters
 
 Mayo is a 15-year-old delinquent who transfers to Fuka Academy after being kicked out of seven different schools. She is an extremely powerful MiKO as well as a competent fighter. When in battle her personality becomes extremely dark; she also does not remember later on that she was in a fight, implying that she might have multiple personalities. She has the power of telekinesis.

Mayo is kept in a pair of handcuffs that severely limit her hand movement. The handcuffs are gold in color and said to be shaped like dragons biting their own tails (much like an Ouroboros). The handcuffs appear to be unbreakable, as other characters have attempted to force them off but were unable to inflict even slight damage. The handcuffs do not seem to hinder her daily life, mostly because of her telekinetic abilities. The handcuffs, however, are often seen gone or separated on the cover of the light novels. In chapter 4 it is revealed that she puts her shirt on with a kind of teleportation accomplished with superfast telekinesis.

In Chapter 6, it is revealed that Mayo is the host of the dragon priestess, Fuhao. Her telekinesis increases by a tenfold as it is said that she could easily lift a clocktower and throw it away. She also seems to have control over wind.

 
 Shion  is a MiKO with the power of retrocognition. Mayo insists that the two of them were good friends in the past, but Shion does not recall or believe this at all (despite Mayo knowing her name).

Returning My-HiME Characters 

 Shizuru Fujino 
is the Student Council President of Fuuka Academy. She is first seen in chapter 1, and ends up defeating a group of Yakuza who attack the academy. She is also a MiKO; her abilities seem to enhance her abilities with a katana, enabling her to perform impossible feats - she even slices an armored car in half lengthwise. She too possess telekinesis, but it's unknown how powerful it is.

 Natsuki Kuga
is a student at Fuuka Academy. She is first seen in chapter 2 helping Mayo adjust to life at Fuuka. Her MiKO abilities allow her to summon two guns, similar to her element in My-HiME that fire psychic bullets. It's also stated that she has an addiction to mayonnaise, similar to the original My-HiME character who put mayonnaise on everything (in the manga), and as shown in the special 16 of the anime.

 Nao Yuuki
is a student at Fuuka Academy. Her MiKO ability appears to be identical to Mayo's telekinesis. She is first seen in chapter 2 tormenting Mayo

 Haruka Suzushiro
is the Secretary General of Fuuka Academy, and just like her My-HiME incarnation, she deals with all the discipline. It is not yet known if she has any MiKO powers, though it was stated that she is one of the most powerful telekinetic wielders of the Academy.

 Yukino Kikukawa
is the Student Council Treasurer, still Haruka's loyal sidekick and correcting her mistakes with her wording. She is a MiKO with great telepathic powers and is able to read minds even inside Fuuka Academy's grounds, where mind-reading should be greatly reduced by barrier-like devices.

 Akane Higurashi
is a student at Fuuka academy and was in Aoi's first year class. She is a MiKO who has the power to read memories. She is the leader of the Suzuka Alliance.

 Midori Sugiura
appears as a student at Fuka Academy as well.  It is unknown if she is a MiKO or if she is undercover.

 Chie Harada
is very similar to her My-HiME incarnation in which she carries around a cell phone, always hangs around Aoi, and likes to listen to the gossip. It is unknown if she is a MiKO.

 Aoi Senoh
as with Chie, she is very similar to her My-HiME incarnation, and still hangs around Chie. She is also very friendly towards Mayo, and is friends with Akane. It is unknown if she has any MiKO powers.

 Nagi Homura
is a student at Fuuka Academy and seems to be able to read minds through touch. He shows an interest in Mayo and underestimated her abilities at first. He seems to be a highly suspicious character around the school.

 Reito Kanzaki
seems to still be the Vice President of the Student Council, with practically the same personality as his My-HiME incarnation. His brother, Rei Kanzaki is the principal of Fuuka Academy.

 Masashi Takeda
is the leader of the Athletics Club and seems to be the one to respark the wars on campus by attacking the Kuga Faction, consisting of Natsuki, Mayo, and Shion. Humorously, he is still madly in love with Natsuki. He also seems to have MiKO powers which enhances his kendo sword abilities.

 Fumi Himeno
is the Chairwoman of the academy next to the principal, Rei Kanzaki. It is unknown if she has MiKO powers yet.

 Miya Suzuki
is a classmate of Mayo who is a member of the Suzuka Alliance that leads Mayo into a trap set by Tomoe. She bears a closer resemblance to Miya Clochette from My-Otome than her namesake in the My-HiME anime. It is unknown if she has MiKO powers.

 Kiyone Nonomiya
is a classmate of Natsuki. She was first seen hung upside down in a tree by her ankles. She has the power of teleportation.

Returning My-Otome Characters 

Tomoe Hinagiku seems to be associated with the Suzaku Alliance.

Other characters 

Rei Kanzaki is the principal of Fuuka Academy, and seems intent on keeping the school peaceful. His most distinctive characteristic is that he is bald. It is unknown if he has MiKO powers.

Negishi is a member of the Yakuza. He was once a member of the gang Bangachi which was destroyed by Shizuru Fujuno. He comes to the school to get revenge.

2007 Japanese novels
2007 manga
HJ Bunko
My-HiME
Shōnen manga
Light novels